The 2011 League of Ireland Cup Final also known as the 2011 EA Sports Cup Final was the final match of the 2011 League of Ireland Cup, the 38th season of the League of Ireland Cup, a football competition for the 27 teams from the Premier Division, First Division, A Championship and the Ulster Senior League. The match was contested by Cork City and Derry City, at Turners Cross in Cork on 24 September 2011. It was broadcast live on Setanta Sports.

Route to the final

Cork City

Derry City

Final

Summary
The final was played on 24 September 2011 at Cork's Turners Cross. Derry City defeated Cork City 1-0, thanks to a penalty scored by Éamon Zayed. This was Derry City's record 10th League of Ireland Cup.

Details

References

Cup Final
2011
Final
League Of Ireland Cup Final 2011
League Of Ireland Cup Final 2011
League Of Ireland Cup Final